Sezer Badur (born 20 June 1984 in West Berlin) is a Turkish-German footballer who plays as an attacking midfielder.

Club career
During his youth Badur played for several local clubs in his hometown Berlin. 2002 he moved to the youth ranks of Borussia Dortmund, however left the club only after a year to join Turkish Manisaspor.

His debut in Turkish football scene was with Vestel Manisaspor in 2003–04. He appeared in eight matches for Manisaspor but he could not score. Then he returned to Germany to play for the amateur side Berliner AK 07 since he was out of favor at Manisaspor, and Manisaspor were unwilling to let him out of his contract.

He played two years in amateur division in Germany. After a short stint with SV Yeşilyurt he was transferred to Karşıyaka, a football team based in İzmir Province. After a while the team did not pay his salary. Therefore, he left the team. Subsequently, Sivasspor signed Badur where he began to shine and had two consecutive seasons where he and his teammates played the top of the table, missing the champion's trophy narrowly twice. After his successful time for Sivasspor, in January 2010, Trabzonspor acquired Badur's services for a transfer fee of €330,000.

Honours
Trabzonspor
Turkish Cup: 2009–10

References 

1984 births
Living people
Footballers from Berlin
German footballers
Turkish footballers
Manisaspor footballers
Trabzonspor footballers
Sivasspor footballers
Gaziantepspor footballers
Elazığspor footballers
Süper Lig players
SV Yeşilyurt players
Berliner AK 07 players
Karşıyaka S.K. footballers
TFF First League players
Association football midfielders